Mark Forster may refer to:

 Mark Forster (author), British author
 Mark Forster (footballer) (born 1964), English footballer
 Mark Forster (rugby league) (born 1964), rugby league footballer
 Mark Forster (singer) (born 1984), German singer

See also
 Marc Forster (born 1969), German-Swiss filmmaker and screenwriter
 Mark Foster (disambiguation)